William Hatt was Dean  of Brechin from 1891 until his death  on 29 April 1913: he was Rector of Muchalls from 1865 until 1911, when he died.

Notes

Scottish Episcopalian clergy
Deans of Brechin
1913 deaths
Year of birth missing